The flag of Réunion is the flag of the department of Réunion, France. The region uses the flag of France, the national flag of the country. Although the decentralization of France installed a number of flags of the metropolitan regions, Réunion does not have a separate official flag. However, the Regional Council of Réunion does have a flag.

Other flags

Lö Mahavéli
The Vexillological Association of Réunion selected a flag in 2003. It depicts the volcano of la Fournaise, bedecked by gold sunbeams. It was designed in 1974 by Guy Pignolet with help of Jean Finck and Didier Finck who called it Lö Mahavéli but it really started to be promoted once the association chose it in 2003. It does not have official recognition but since 2014, it is flying outside or on top of many public buildings, like at the town halls of Saint-Denis and Saint-Philippe, after several city councils have taken the decision to do so. The flag is included in many versions of emoji.

Regional council flag
The Regional Council of Réunion uses a flag depicting a stylized representation of the island with the text "Region Reunion". Variants also exist which add the words and "Valorisons nos atouts" (Let's value our strengths) in French and five coloured squares to represent equality and diversity.

Independentist flag
Independentists and nationalists of Réunion also have their flag (green, yellow, red) which was created in 1986. Green symbolizes the marronage, yellow symbolizes the working class and red symbolizes the period of slavery and indentured labour, struck by a yellow star with five points.

Background
Réunion is an island in the Indian Ocean, east of Madagascar and 175 kilometres (109 mi) southwest of Mauritius. It accounts for one of the regions of France. As of 2014, it had a population of 844,994. The island has been an overseas region of France since 1946.

See also
 Coat of arms of Réunion

References

 Article at Flags of the World

External links

Flags of Overseas France
Flag